François André Camoin (June 20, 1939 – March 18, 2019), born in Nice, France, was an American short story writer.

Life
He came to the United States in 1952. He graduated from the University of Massachusetts with a Ph.D. in 1967. He taught at the University of Utah until 2011 when he retired due to illness.  His students included authors Chuck Rosenthal and Rob Roberge. He lived in Salt Lake City with his wife, sons, and dogs. According to his wife Shelley, he had a particular fondness for peppermint bark.

His work appears in Mid-American Review, Missouri Review, Nimrod, and Quarterly West.

Awards
 1985 Flannery O'Connor Award for Short Fiction
 1995 Salt Lake City Mayor's Artist Award
 2004 Utah Humanities Council Grant

Works

 (Reprint)

Anthologies

References

American short story writers
University of Massachusetts Amherst alumni
University of Utah faculty
People from Nice
1939 births
Living people